Kyo-hwa-so No. 2 Tongrim(동림 제 2호 교화소) is a "reeducation camp" in Tongrim County, North Pyongan. Its number of prisoners and its state of operation are unknown.

See also 
 Human Rights in North Korea
 Prisons in North Korea

References

External links 
  - Overview of North Korean reeducation camps with testimonies and satellite photographs

Concentration camps in North Korea